This is a list of submissions to the 48th Academy Awards for Best Foreign Language Film. The Academy Award for Best Foreign Language Film was created in 1956 by the Academy of Motion Picture Arts and Sciences to honour non-English-speaking films produced outside the United States. The award is handed out annually, and is accepted by the winning film's director, although it is considered an award for the submitting country as a whole. Countries are invited by the Academy to submit their best films for competition according to strict rules, with only one film being accepted from each country.

For the 48th Academy Awards, twenty-one films were submitted in the category Academy Award for Best Foreign Language Film. The highlighted titles were the five nominated films, which came from Italy, Japan, Mexico, Poland and the Soviet Union, which won the award for a second time, for Japanese co-production Dersu Uzala, directed by Akira Kurosawa.

Submissions

References

Sources
 Margaret Herrick Library, Academy of Motion Picture Arts and Sciences

48